is a freight terminal in Nagaoka, Niigata Prefecture, Japan, operated by Japan Freight Railway Company (JR Freight).

Lines
The freight terminal is located on the Jōetsu Line and Shin'etsu Main Line.

Railway stations in Nagaoka, Niigata